The 30th César Awards ceremony, presented by the Académie des Arts et Techniques du Cinéma, honoured the best films of 2004 in France and took place on 26 February 2005 at the Théâtre du Châtelet in Paris. The ceremony was chaired by Isabelle Adjani and hosted by Gad Elmaleh. Games of Love and Chance won the award for Best Film.

Winners and nominees

Viewers
The show was followed by 3.3 million viewers. This corresponds to 15.8% of the audience.

See also
 77th Academy Awards
 58th British Academy Film Awards
 17th European Film Awards
 10th Lumières Awards

References

External links

 Official website
 
 30th César Awards at AlloCiné

2005
2005 film awards
2005 in French cinema
2005 in Paris
February 2005 events in France